The American Solar Energy Society (ASES) is an association of solar professionals and advocates in the United States. Founded in 1954, ASES is dedicated to inspiring energy innovation and speeding up the transition toward a sustainable energy economy. The nonprofit advances on education, research and policy.

Based in Boulder, Colorado, ASES is the American affiliate of the International Solar Energy Society.

ASES envisions a world equitably transformed to 100% renewable energy.

Their mission statement: ASES accelerates equitable solar adoption and universal sustainable living by educating and building community.

ASES publishes Solar Today magazine,organizes the National Solar Tour, produces the National Solar Energy Conference, and advocates for policies to promote the research, commercialization and deployment of renewable energy.

Solar Today
Solar Today is a magazine published by the American Solar Energy Society.

The magazine, published four times a year, covers renewable energy technologies, including photovoltaics, passive solar and other climate-responsive building strategies. The magazine traditionally provides:

 Case histories
 "How-to" articles offering advice on making sustainable energy and product choices
 Coverage of new products and services
 Energy-efficiency Q&As
 Analysis from leaders in the solar/renewable energy field

Solar Today is received by members of ASES.

National Solar Tour
The annual National Solar Tour is organized by ASES.

The Solar Tour offers participants an opportunity to tour homes and buildings to see how neighbours are using solar energy, energy efficiency, and sustainable technologies to reduce their monthly utility bills and help tackle climate change.

The Solar Tour takes place annually during the first Saturday in October, in conjunction with National Energy Awareness Month.

A focus of the tour is on energy-saving techniques and sustainability through building design, energy efficient appliances, and the use of green materials during remodeling. Tours also provide information on how to save money with federal, state and local incentives.

National Solar Conference
For over 50 years, the ASES National Solar Conference has been a conference on the emerging trends, technology, and opportunities shaping the new energy economy. It is the premier educational event for solar energy professionals.

Chapters
ASES  has several regional and state chapters throughout the country, comprising more than 13,000 members. As of June 2021, there are 40 ASES Chapters including 10 student chapters of ASES.  ASES is actively supporting the formation of more student chapters.

See also
American Council on Renewable Energy
International Solar Energy Society
Electric Power Research Institute
Energy conservation
Energy Information Administration
National Renewable Energy Laboratory
Renewable energy commercialization in the United States
Solar Energy Industries Association
Solar power plants in the Mojave Desert
National Solar Conference and World Renewable Energy Forum 2012

References

External links
 ASES
 Solar Today 
 American Solar Energy Society Wins $100k Recognition Award from American Express
 Solar Today magazine

Renewable energy organizations based in the United States
Solar energy in the United States